The Children's Literature Legacy Award (known as the Laura Ingalls Wilder Medal until 2018) is a prize awarded by the Association for Library Service to Children (ALSC), a division of the American Library Association (ALA), to writers or illustrators of children's books published in the United States who have, over a period of years, made substantial and lasting contributions to children's literature. The bronze medal prize was named after its first winner, twentieth-century American author Laura Ingalls Wilder.

Originally, the Laura Ingalls Wilder Medal was awarded every five years, awarding six prizes between 1955 and 1980. From 1980 to 2001 it was awarded every three years, awarding seven prizes. From 2001 to 2015 it was awarded every two years. The most recent author to receive the award was James E. Ransome in 2023. It is now awarded annually.

Criteria
 The medal may be awarded to an author or illustrator including co-authors or co-illustrators, and persons who both write and illustrate. The person may be nominated posthumously.
 Some portion of the nominee's active career in books for children must have occurred in the twenty-five years prior to nomination.
 Citizenship or residence of the potential nominee is not to be considered.
 The nominee's work must be published in the United States but this does not mean that the first publication had to be in the United States. It means that books by the nominee have been published in the United States, and it is those books which are to be considered in the nomination process.
  At least some of the books by the potential nominee must have been available to children for at least ten years.
 The books, by their nature or number, occupy an important place in literature for American children, and children have read the books, and the books continue to be requested and read by children.
 The committee is to direct its attention only to the part of the nominee's total work that is books for children (up to and including age fourteen).

Renaming
In February 2018, the Association for Library Service to Children (ALSC), the division of ALA that administers the award, announced a taskforce which re-examined the naming of the award and included representation from the American Indian Library Association (AILA). The task force was convened because of criticism of Wilder's depictions of Native and African Americans. A recommendation to rename the award was made on June 23, 2018. The ALSC board found Wilder's body of work "includes expressions of stereotypical attitudes inconsistent with ALSC's core values of inclusiveness, integrity and respect, and responsiveness." The ALSC considered Wilder's depictions of minorities to be racist, in particular Native Americans. The award's name was officially changed to the "Children's Literature Legacy Award."

Recipients

See also
 
 List of ALA awards
 Caldecott Medal
 Newbery Medal
 Margaret A. Edwards Award

References

External links
Fraser, Caroline. “Yes, ‘Little House on the Prairie’ is racially insensitive — but we should still read it.” The Washington Post, March 13, 2018.  Accessed July 31, 2019.
Yorio, Kara. “ALSC Changes Wilder Award to Children's Literature Legacy Award.”  SLJ School Library Journal, June 24, 2018. Accessed July 31, 2019.
Chow, Kat. “Little House On The Controversy: Laura Ingalls Wilder's Name Removed From Book Award.” NPR National Public Radio, June 25, 2018. Accessed July 31, 2019.
“Historical Perspective or Racism in Little House on the Prairie?” (Laura McLemore, December 7, 2018). Accessed July 31, 2019.

American children's literary awards
American Library Association awards
Awards established in 1954
 
Little House series
English-language literary awards